Paul Damien Mondoloni (c. September 27, 1916 – July 29, 1985), alias Monsieur Paul, was a Corsican mafioso who was an important figure of the French Connection. He was killed in 1985. He was the associate of Marcel Francisci.

References 
 "Le retour de la mafia corse", Le Monde, 22 May 2006 (by Jacques Follorou)

French Connection gangsters
1916 births
1985 deaths